D N Himatsingka High School is a Bengali Medium high school in Kokrajhar, Assam, India. It has a current student strength of around 1200 students with more than 60 faculty members. It has a large playground. It is situated at Subhaspally..

History
The primary section of the school was founded in 1942 with the high school being established in 1958. This is one of the oldest schools in Kokrajhar district.

Sport
The school enters cricket teams in district tournaments.

Notable faculty
 Sri Sukharanjan Das, former Headmaster, listed on the government website as one of the 46 most prominent citizens of Kokrajhar.
 Sri Subodh Kr. Bagchi, former Headmaster, listed on the government website as one of the 46 most prominent citizens of Kokrajhar.

References

External links
 Official Facebook site

Kokrajhar
High schools and secondary schools in Assam
Educational institutions established in 1958
1958 establishments in Assam